Centennial High School  is a public high school in Compton, California, part of the Los Angeles metropolitan area.

Construction of Centennial High School began in 1953, and it was erected in 1954, with its first graduating class in 1954. It is the smallest of the three high schools in the Compton Unified School District, which also includes Compton High School and Manuel Dominguez High School.

Student population and demographics 
Approximately 1,230 students attend Centennial High School.
 9th Grade: 450
 10th Grade: 329
 11th Grade: 319
 12th Grade: 272

The ethnic composition of the student body is:
 64% Latino
 33% African-American
 1% Two or more races
 2% Other, multiple, declined to state, or non-response.

Students speak English and/or Spanish.  48% of the students are Second-Language Learners (SLL) with 33% of the total enrollment classified as Limited English Proficiency (LEP).

Special Education students comprise 11% of the total enrollment.  Of this, 5% are identified as Resource Specialist Program (RSP) and 6% as Special Day Class (SDC).

All students in attendance qualify for the National School Lunch Program receiving free or reduced breakfast and lunch.

Certificated staff profile 
The certificated staff and faculty at Centennial High School is ethnically composed of the following as of 2009:

 43% African-American
 1% American Indian or Alaska Native
 6% Asian
 27% Caucasian
 3% Filipino
 11% Latino
 1% Pacific Islander
 7% Multiple or No Response.

The California Department of Education mandates a qualification for subject teaching known as a "Clear Credential". 91% of certificated staff hold a Clear Credential and all except for five staff members met the No Child Left Behind Act (NCLB) requirements of "Highly Qualified Teacher".

Academics 
The school offers eleven Advanced Placement courses.

Accountability Progress Reporting (APR) 2009–2010 CDOE
Centennial High School is designated by the Compton Unified School District as a Title I school.  For over 5 years, the school has remained a Program Improvement (PI) school.  As of the 2009-2010 school year, Centennial is in state rank 1 and also ranks 1 with similar schools.

Centennial High School has not met its state-identified goals for student progress in all areas each year since 2006.  Students failed to meet the No Child Left Behind Act's Adequate Yearly Progress (AYP) requirements in English Language Arts (ELA) or Mathematics for all significant subgroups. Centennial remains in year 5+ of school-wide Program Improvement (PI).

2010 data
 CAHSEE English Language Arts (ELA): In 2010, of 270 sophomores, 177 passed the ELA examination, or 66%.  Of this number, 52 of 82 African-American students passed, or 63%.  122 of 182 Latino students passed, or 67%.
 CAHSEE Mathematics: In 2010, of 275 sophomores, 163 passed the Math examination, or 59%.  Of this number, 43 of 83 African-American students passed, or 52%.  116 of 185 Latino students passed, or 63%.
California Standardized Testing and Reporting (STAR) Program: California requires a minimum Academic Performance Index (API) score of at least 650.  As of 2010, Centennial High School's API was 573, well below the statewide performance target of 800. Test scores indicate that the vast majority of students are not proficient or advanced and many of them are far below grade level in all core academic areas.

Graduation rate 
Identified as a Tier 1 school in the Spring of 2010 by the California Department of Education (CDOE), Centennial High School had a standing graduation rate of 58.9% and since then has been reclassified as a “persistently low-achieving school” by the Assessment and Accountability Division, with graduation rates below 60% for three years or more.  California State and Federal Government guidelines for high school graduation rates dictate that all schools should be at 83%, or grow .01% over the past year or .02% over the past 2 years.  Currently, the graduation rate at Centennial High School is 58.9%.  Therefore, Centennial has chosen the "Transformation Intervention Model" in an effort to increase retention of students, student achievement and the site’s graduation rate.

Sports 
The Centennial Apaches compete in the Bay League of the California Interscholastic Federation (CIF).

Notable alumni 

 Arron Afflalo (class of 2004), basketball player
 Larry Allen, former NFL player (transferred before graduating)
 Brittany Barber (Class of 2004), Singer/ Songwriter  
 Big Fase 100, rapper
 Omar Bradley (Class of 1976; voted "Mr. Apache" in senior class poll), mayor of Compton (1993-2001)
 Deonte Burton (Class of 2010), basketball player
 Ken Dennis Masters world record sprinter
 Dr. Dre, rapper & music producer
 Charles Dumas, high jumper
 Allan Ellis, former NFL player
 Tony Franklin, (Class of 1968) baseball player
 Donte Gamble, former CFL player
 Mitch Johnson, former NFL player
 Kendrick Lamar, record producer & rapper
 Paul Lowe, former NFL player
 Don Wilson (baseball), (Class of 1963) former Major League Baseball pitcher for the Houston Astros
 Lenny Randle, (Class of 1967) former Major League Baseball {MLB} player 
 Reggie Smith, baseball player
 Wayne Simpson, former Major League Baseball pitcher
 Bobby Thompson, former NFL player
 Frank K. Wheaton, (Class of 1969; senior class president) sports agent  
 Roy White, (Class of 1961) baseball player

References

External links
 Official Athletics Website for the Centennial Apaches
 Centennial High Alumni: Social Networking Website
 Centennial High School Alumni Association (C.H.S.A.A.): Website

High schools in Los Angeles County, California
Public high schools in California
Compton, California
Educational institutions established in 1954
1954 establishments in California